The 1978 South Dakota gubernatorial election was held on November 7, 1978, to elect a Governor of South Dakota. Republican nominee Bill Janklow was elected, defeating Democratic nominee Roger D.  McKellips.

Democratic primary

Candidates
 Roger D. McKellips, Member of South Dakota Senate
 Harvey L. Wollman, incumbent Governor of South Dakota
 John Bohr

Results

Republican primary

Candidates
Bill Janklow, Attorney General of South Dakota
 LeRoy G. Hoffman, member of the South Dakota Senate
 Clint Roberts, member of the South Dakota Senate

Results

General election

Results

References

1978
South Dakota
Gubernatorial
November 1978 events in the United States